Chasmomma is a genus of hoverflies.

Species
C. nigrum Curran, 1927

References

Diptera of Africa
Hoverfly genera
Eristalinae
Taxa named by Mario Bezzi